Goodhew is a surname, and may refer to:

 Goodhew (Kent cricketer) (flourished 18th century; first name unknown), English cricketer
 Billy Goodhew (1828–1897), English cricketer
 Duncan Goodhew (born 1957), English competitive swimmer
 Harry Goodhew (born 1931), Anglican Archbishop of Sydney from 1993 to 2001
 Jo Goodhew (born 1961), New Zealand politician
 Mary Goodhew, British ballet performer, teacher, and director
 Peter Goodhew (born 1943), British electron microscopist
 Reginald Goodhew (died 1942), British Spitfire pilot
 Victor Goodhew (1919–2006), British politician